Boko is a settlement in Bignona Department of Ziguinchor Region in the Basse Casamance area of south-west Senegal.

In the 2002 census its population was 393 inhabitants in 55 households.

References

External links
PEPAM

Populated places in the Bignona Department